Morton Patrick Traylor (April 6, 1918 – April 28, 1996) was an American fine artist, designer, serigrapher and founder of the Virginia Art Institute in Charlottesville, Virginia.

Biography
Born in Petersburg, Virginia, on April 6, 1918, Morton Traylor lived in Los Angeles most of his life. After graduating from Eagle Rock High School, he entered Los Angeles City College, where his formal art training began.

In 1964, he established the Virginia Art Institute in Charlottesville, Virginia.

Morton Traylor's artwork can be found in museums and private collections around the world including the Georgia Museum of Art and The British Museum.

Professional life
 National Features Syndicate, New York, New York
 McNaught Syndicate, St. Louis, Missouri.
 Whitman Publishing Co. (Dell Comics) Beverley Hills, California
 Northrop Aviation Co. Commercial Art Dept., Hawthorne, California
 Art Director, "TRYOUT", Big Bear Lake, California
 Owned and Operated Advertising Co., San Bernardino, California
 President of Inter-Mountain Concert Society, California
 Director of Lex Advertising Co., Charlottesville, Virginia
 Owned and Operated Virginia Art & Advertising, Crozet, Virginia
 Founder/Director of Virginia Art Institute, Charlottesville, Virginia

Awards and honors
 President of Kappa Tau Sigma, Honorary Art Society (1939)
 LACC Summer Scholarship to Chouinard Art Institute through Latham Contest (1939)
 Annual Scholarship to Chouinard through National competition  (1940)
 Graduated from LACC as one of six Honor Students Continuing Scholarship to Chouinard Art Institute  (1941)
 First Prize (Drawing) 3rd National Veterans' Exhibition, Long Beach, California (1949)
 First Prize (Drawing) 5th Annual, Alley Gallery, Charlottesville, Virginia  (1964)
 First Prize (Print) Contemporary Southern Art Festival, Charlottesville, Virginia (1964)
 Hon. Mention, Southern Art Festival, Atlanta Georgia (1964)

National and group exhibitions
 Municipal Art Commission, City Han, Los Angeles, California (1946)
 Solon de L'Art Libre, Modern Museum of Art, Paris, France (1947)
 First Annual Veterans' Exhibition, L. A. Museum of Art, Los Angeles, California (1946)
 City Show at Greek Theatre, Los Angeles, California. (1946–47)
 National Orange Show, San Bernardino, California  (1949–50)
 Los Angeles Art Association, Los Angeles, California (1949–51)
 Print Club, Albany, New York National Serigraph Society, New York City, N. Y. (1949)
 Oakland Art Gallery, Oakland, California San Francisco Museum of Art, California (1949)
 Arizona State Fair, Phoenix Arizona Modern Institute of Art, Beverly Hills, California (1949)
 First Annual Exhibition, Santa Paula, California (1949)
 Los Angeles Annual, County Museum, Los Angeles, California (1950–55)
 Los Angeles County Fair, Pomona, California (1950)
 Western Drawing Institute Show, Jepson's Gallery, Los Angeles, California (1950–51)
 Pennell Exhibition, Library of Congress, Washington, D. C. (1950)
 Laguna National Print Exhibition, Laguna Beach, California (1950)
 California State Fair, Sacramento, California (1949–50)
 Landau Gallery Group Show, LaCieniga Blvd., Los Angeles, California (1951)

Publications
 Newspaper "Paris Montparnasse" Paris, France (1947)
 Art News Magazine, December (1950)
 Newspaper "Times" Los Angeles, California (1949)
 "Sacramento Bee" Sacramento, California (1954)
 Les Archives Historiques D'Art Contemporain De La Biennale De Venise (1954)
 Prints of California Artists, Crest of Hollywood, California (1954)
 The News-Review Roseburg, Oregon (1986)

Artists from Los Angeles
Painters from Virginia
People from Petersburg, Virginia
Los Angeles City College alumni
American alumni of the École des Beaux-Arts
1918 births
1996 deaths
Chouinard Art Institute alumni
20th-century American painters
American male painters
20th-century American printmakers
20th-century American male artists